Paul Constantinescu (30 June 1909, Ploieşti – 20 December 1963) was a Romanian composer. Two of his main influences are Romanian folk music and Byzantine chant, both of which he used in his teaching. One of his students was composer Margareta Xenopol.

From 1928-33 he studied at the Bucharest Conservatory (now known as the National University of Music Bucharest) with Castaldi, Jora, Cuclin and Brǎiloiu, and then in Vienna from 1934-35 with Schmidt and Marx. Returning to Bucharest, he taught from 1937-41 at the Academy for Religious Music, and then from 1941 until his death was a professor of composition at the Conservatory. He received the Enescu prize in 1932, and the Romanian Academy prize in 1956.

Constantinescu used folk and liturgical elements in his works, with a strong command of form and modal harmony. He did much to pave the way for the post-Enescu generation of Romanian nationalist composers.

Works
Dramatic
O noaptefurtunoasǎ, comic opera (1934; rev. 1950; Bucharest, May 19, 1951)
Nunta in Carpa\i, choreographic poem (Bucharest, May 5, 1938)
Panǎ Lesnea Rusalim, opera (1954–55, Cluj-Napoca, June 26, 1956).

Orchestral
Suitǎ roma⌢neascǎ (1930–36; rev. 1942)
Jocuri roma⌢neşti (1936)
Burlesca for Piano and Orch. (1937; Bucharest Radio, March 7, 1938)
Simfonietǎ (1937; Bucharest Radio, March 16, 1938)
Symphony No. 1 (1944; Bucharest, May 18, 1947; rev. 1955)
Variatuni libere asupra unei melodii bizantine din sec. XIII for Cello and Orch. (1946; rev. 1951)
Concerto for Strings (1947; rev. 1955; Bucharest, Feb. 16, 1956)
Rapsodia II (1949; Bucharest, Oct. 15, 1950)
Balada haiduceasca for Cello and Orch. (1950; Bucharest, Dec. 23, 1951)
Suitǎ bucovineanǎ (1951)
Piano Concerto (1952; Bucharest, May 16, 1953)
Juventus, overture (1952)
Rapsodie olteneascǎ (1957)
Violin Concerto (1957; Brasov, May 21, 1958)
Infrǎ&lire, choreographic rhapsody (Bucharest, Aug. 20, 1959)
Harp Concerto (1960; Bucharest, May 4, 1961)
Symphony No. 2, Simfonie ploieşteanǎ (Ploieşti, Sept. 29, 1961)
Triple Concerto for Violin, Cello, Piano, and Orch. (Bucharest, Dec. 28, 1963).

CHAMBER:
Studii ȋn stil bizantin for Violin, Viola, and Cello (1929)
Quintet (1932)
Violin Sonatina (1933)
Sonatinǎ bizantinǎ for Solo Cello or Viola (1940)
Cintec vechi pe 2 melodii din Anton Pann for Cello and Piano (1952)
piano pieces.

VOCAL:
Isarlik for Soprano and Orch. (1936)
Ryga Crypto şi Lapona Enigel for Soli, Reciter, and Orch. (1936; rev. 1951; Bucharest, June 1, 1966)
Byzantinisches Passions und Osteroratorium for Soli, Chorus, and Orch. (1943; Bucharest, March 3, 1946; rev. 1948)
Byzantinisches Weihnachtoratorium for Soli, Chorus, and Orch. (Bucharest, Dec. 21, 1947)
Uli\a noastrd, 7 songs for Baritone and orch. (1960)
other songs.

Recordings
Violin concerto (Olympia, OCD417, released 1991), with works by Nichifor (Symph. 4) and Toduţǎ (Tablatura for Lute)
Ballad of the Outlaw for cello and orchestra, Concerto for Strings, Byzantine variations for cello and orchestra, Concerto for Harp (Olympia, OCD415)
Played by the Romanian State Philharmonic Orchestra/conductor: Ion Baciu
(Both recordings are re-issues of LPs on the Electrecord label)
Piano concerto (1952) and the Symphony No. 1 (1955 - a revised version of the 1944 symphony) on Olympia OCD 411 (released in 1991) — played by the Cluj "Transilvania" Philharmonic Orchestra with conductor Emil Simon and pianist Valentin Gheorghiu (again a re-issue of an Electrecord recording)
Suite for piano (No. 1 Joc, No. 2 Cantec, No. 3 Joc dobrogean) (1952) played by pianists Dana Ciocarlie [on label Empreinte ED13122 (2000), with piano works by Enescu, Bartók], and  Mihaela Ursuleasa (on label Berlin Classics in 2011)
The Nativity (Byzantine Christmas Oratorio) (1947) performed by the Bucharest "George Enescu" Choir and Philharmonic Orchestra on label:  Olympia OCD 402 and Electrocord Romania EDC 391
Passion and Resurrection (Byzantine Easter Oratorio) (1946) performed by the Bucharest "Corul Academic Radio" and "Orchestra Națională Radio" on Editura Casa Radio ECR 293 (2011)

Bibliography
Hârlav-Maistorovici, Sanda (2015): „Creația componistică a lui Paul Constaninescu. Catalog cronologic”, București: Editura Muzicală

References

1909 births
1963 deaths
People from Ploiești
20th-century classical composers
Romanian opera composers
Romanian classical composers
Romanian film score composers